Vellankulam is a small town in Sri Lanka. It is located within Northern Province.  The village of Vellankulam is located in Mannar District, 340 kilometers north of Colombo. This region was greatly affected by the Sri Lankan Civil War, and as a result many of the roads are in poor condition. Due to the neglected condition of the roads, it takes about nine hours to reach the village from Colombo.

See also
List of towns in Northern Province, Sri Lanka

References

External links

Populated places in Northern Province, Sri Lanka